Surnaya (Nepali: सुर्नया ) is a Gaupalika(Nepali: गाउपालिका ; gaupalika) in Baitadi District in the Sudurpashchim Province of far-western Nepal. 
Surnaya has a population of 18549.The land area is 124.52 km2.

References

Rural municipalities in Baitadi District
Rural municipalities of Nepal established in 2017